The Lutheran Hymnal (TLH) is one of the official hymnals of the Lutheran Church–Missouri Synod (LCMS). Published in 1941 by Concordia Publishing House in St. Louis, Missouri, it was the denomination's second official English-language hymnal, succeeding the 1912 Evangelical Lutheran Hymn-Book. A 1969 Worship Supplement contains additional hymns and service music.

History 
Development of TLH began as a revision of the Evangelical Lutheran Hymn-Book that was authorized in 1929. The next year, the work continued through the collaborative effort of the Evangelical Lutheran Synodical Conference of North America and in 1941, TLH became the common hymnal for conference's member churches. It contains 668 chorales, hymns, carols, and chants, plus the liturgy for the Common Service, Matins, Vespers, and propers, collects, prayers, suffrages, canticles, psalms, and miscellaneous tables. Its popularity meant that attempts to replaceit in more recent years have often met with strong resistance.

The first attempt to replace TLH began in 1965, when the LCMS began work on the Lutheran Book of Worship and invited other Lutheran denominations in North America to participate in its creation. As a result of disagreement and compromise with the other churches involved in LBWs production, the LCMS objected to some of its content, and Lutheran Book of Worship was published in 1978 without the endorsement of the very church body that had initiated its production. An LCMS revision of LBW was quickly published in 1982 under the title Lutheran Worship. Lutheran Worship (LW) was intended to replace TLH as the official hymnal of the LCMS; however, many congregations were still unsatisfied with the final product, leading them to continue using TLH. According to a 1999 survey by the LCMS' Commission on Worship, approximately 36% of the synod's congregations were still using TLH as their main hymnal, and even more were continuing to use it in combination with LW and/or other hymnals and hymnal supplements. An even newer hymnal, Lutheran Service Book (LSB), published in 2006, has restored many of the former hymnal's features in the hope that more widespread use can be achieved. In the Wisconsin Evngelical Lutheran Synod, TLH was effectively replaced by Christian Worship: A Lutheran Hymnal in 1993, and few congregations continue to use it on a regular basis.

The initial editions of TLH were bound in blue, and the hymnal has been simultaneously available in both red and blue cover versions for much of its history. The red cover version is now more common. The widespread use of Lutheran Service Book has begun the process of resolving the LCMS' hymnal controversy, as initial reviews have been generally quite favorable. Concordia Publishing House has announced that all TLH-related supplemental materials, including specialized accompaniment editions and the agenda, will go out of print when current supplies are depleted, but plans to continue to produce the pew edition for the foreseeable future. TLH remains an officially sanctioned hymnal of the synod.

See also
 List of English-language hymnals by denomination

References

External links
 Lutheran-Hymnal.com - The Lutheran Hymnal Online, archived September 4, 2019 (texts with midi files)
  LCMS: A Brief History of LCMS Hymnals
 Database of Lutheran Hymns, shows which hymn is in which hymnal

1941 books
1941 in Christianity
1941 in music
20th-century Christian texts
Lutheran Church–Missouri Synod
Lutheran hymnals
Wisconsin Evangelical Lutheran Synod